Genoplesium filiforme, commonly known as the glandular midge orchid is a small terrestrial orchid endemic to the east coast of Australia. It has a single thin leaf and up to thirty greenish to purple flowers with a reddish-purple labellum. The edges of its flower parts are covered with many short glandular hairs. It is found from southern Queensland to southern New South Wales.

Description
There is an oblong callus in the centre of the labellum and extending three-quarters of the length of the labellum. Flowering occurs between February and May.<ref name="RBGS">{{cite web|last1=Jones|first1=David|title=Genoplesium filiforme|url=http://plantnet.rbgsyd.nsw.gov.au/cgi-bin/NSWfl.pl?page=nswfl&lvl=sp&name=Genoplesium~filiforme|publisher=Royal Botanic Garden Sydney|accessdate=19 January 2018}}</ref>

Taxonomy and naming
The glandular leek orchid was first formally described in 1885 by Robert D. FitzGerald who gave it the name Prasophyllum filiforme and published the description in Journal of Botany, British and Foreign. In 1989, David Jones and Mark Clements changed the name to Genoplesium filiforme and in 2002 changed the name again to Corunastylis filiformis but the last change is not accepted by the Australian Plant Census.

Distribution and habitatGenoplesium filiforme'' grows in forest, heath and moss gardens over sandstone in near-coastal areas. It is found between Nowra in New South Wales and Helidon in Queensland.

References

filiforme
Endemic orchids of Australia
Orchids of New South Wales
Orchids of Queensland
Plants described in 1885